Red Moon is a 2018 science fiction novel by American novelist Kim Stanley Robinson. The novel is set in China and on the Moon. It was reviewed in several national media outlets, with mixed reception.

Plot 
In the year 2047, Fred Fredericks is sent to the Moon to deliver a quantum communications device. Upon his arrival he is nearly killed during the handover of the device, but cannot remember what happened. He is held on suspicion of murdering the official to whom he was delivering the device. A journalist helps Fredericks and the dissident leader Qi, who is due to give birth soon, escape back to Earth. They are pursued by Chinese authorities who believe that Qi will lead a revolution of disaffected workers and displaced migrants to overthrow the Party leadership. After a series of chases and escapes, Fredericks and Qi return to the Moon, where they encounter a wealthy Chinese businessman building his own ideal colony and visit free settlers creating a lunar city outside government control. One faction of the Chinese leadership orders missile strikes on the Moon to kill Fredericks and Qi, but they receive advance warning of the attacks and flee to a remote lunar shelter, where Qi gives birth as millions of Chinese workers gather in Beijing to start the revolution.

Reception 
According to literary review aggregator LitHub, the book received a slightly larger number of negative reviews than it did positive ones. Jason Sheehan of NPR criticized the book's emphasis on exposition and digressions into discussions of the environment, politics, and orbital mechanics, suggesting that Robinson's approach was "no way to tell a story". Writing for The Guardian, Chris Beckett praised Robinson's depiction of the relationship between Fredericks and Qi, calling it "a delightful and touching depiction of two people who would normally have nothing to do with each other, finding a way of getting along". The Times criticized the "great indigestible tracts of expository dialogue" and "horrible doldrum of narrative drift", but concluded that Red Moon "confirms its author's status as a sci-fi master".

References

2018 American novels
2018 science fiction novels
Novels set on the Moon
Novels set in the future
American science fiction novels
Novels by Kim Stanley Robinson
Novels set in China
Orbit Books books
Little, Brown and Company books